The Lao International is an international badminton tournament held in Laos. The event is part of the Badminton World Federation's International Series and part of the Badminton Asia Circuit.

Past winners

Performances by nation

References

External links

https://bwf.tournamentsoftware.com/sport/tournament?id=5AD42E35-56E2-4FE7-BF3E-3B0204629B36

Badminton tournaments in Laos